Whiteriver Airport  is a public use airport located  southwest of the central business district of Whiteriver, in Navajo County, Arizona, United States. It is owned by the White Mountain Apache Tribe. This airport is included in the National Plan of Integrated Airport Systems, which categorized it as a general aviation facility.

Facilities and aircraft 
It has one runway designated 1/19 with an asphalt surface measuring 6,350 by 75 feet (1,935 x 23 m).

For the 12-month period ending April 27, 2010, the airport had 3,910 aircraft operations, an average of 10 per day: 98.5% general aviation and 1.5% military.

See also 
 List of airports in Arizona

References

External links 
 Whiteriver Airport (E24) at Arizona DOT
 Aerial image as of June 1997 from USGS The National Map
 

Airports in Navajo County, Arizona
Native American airports